Grégory Mohd, better known by his stage name Grag Queen, is a Brazilian singer, songwriter, drag queen and actor. Grag Queen won the first season of Queen of the Universe.

Career 
Grag Queen is a drag performer who won the first season of Queen of the Universe. In 2022, she received Gay Times Honour for Latin American Icon award. Grag Queen has 2.2 million followers on TikTok, as of January 2023.

Music 
Singles released by Grag Queen include  "Party Everyday", "Fim de Tarde", and "You Betta".

Personal life 
Gay Times has said "she wants to use her newfound platform to raise awareness of anti-LGBTQ+ discrimination and violence in Brazil as a result of President Jair Bolsonaro's homophobic administration".

Discography

Extended plays

Filmography

Television

References

External links 

 

1995 births
Living people
Brazilian actors
Brazilian drag queens
Brazilian singers
Queen of the Universe contestants
Singing talent show winners